The Walker Building is one of the original buildings in the downtown area (others are the Santa Fe Depot; the Hoke Building, the Selph Building, the Citizens Bank Building, the Courthouse) in Stillwater.  Built in 1914, it is a two-story red brick, 32 feet wide.  The ground floor is 88 feet deep with a 10-foot passageway in the rear covered by a loft and a second story which is 100 feet deep.

The Walker was originally a grocery, active for about 30 years.

References

Buildings and structures in Stillwater, Oklahoma
Commercial buildings on the National Register of Historic Places in Oklahoma
National Register of Historic Places in Payne County, Oklahoma
1914 establishments in Oklahoma
Commercial buildings completed in 1914